Satya Narayana Shastri was an Indian physician of Ayurveda and a Sanskrit scholar. Born in 1887 in the Indian state of Uttar Pradesh, he was the first honorary physician to Rajendra Prasad, the first president of India. He wrote the introduction of Charaka Samhita, when it was published in 1962. He served as the principal of Ayurveda College of Banaras Hindu University and Government Ayurveda College of Sampurnanand Sanskrit Vishwavidyalaya. The Government of India awarded him Padma Bhushan, the third highest Indian civilian award, in 1954.

See also

 Charaka
 Sushruta Samhita

References

1887 births
Recipients of the Padma Bhushan in medicine
Sanskrit scholars from Uttar Pradesh
Writers from Uttar Pradesh
Sanskrit writers
Academic staff of Banaras Hindu University
Sampurnanand Sanskrit Vishwavidyalaya
Year of death missing